The 1973 Viceroy Classic, also known as the Hong Kong Open, was a men's tennis tournament played on outdoor hard courts in Hong Kong. It was the inaugural edition of the event and was held from 29 October through 4 November 1973. The tournament was part of the Grade C tier of the 1973 Grand Prix tennis circuit. Rod Laver won the singles title.

Finals

Singles

 Rod Laver defeated  Charlie Pasarell 6–3, 3–6, 6–2, 6–2
 It was Laver's 6th singles title of the year and the 61st of his career in the Open Era.

Doubles

 Colin Dibley /  Rod Laver defeated  Paul Gerken /  Brian Gottfried 6–3, 5–7, 17–15

References

External links
 ITF tournament edition details

Viceroy Classic
1973 in Hong Kong
Tennis in Hong Kong